The 2014 Shriram Capital P.L. Reddy Memorial Challenger was a professional tennis tournament played on outdoor hard courts. It was the first edition of the tournament for the men. It was part of the 2014 ATP Challenger Tour. It took place in Chennai, India, on 3 February to 9 February 2014.

Singles main draw entrants

Seeds 

 1 Rankings as of 27 January 2014

Other entrants 
The following players received wildcards into the singles main draw:
  Ramkumar Ramanathan
  Saketh Myneni
  Jeevan Nedunchezhiyan
  N. Sriram Balaji

The following players received entry from the qualifying draw:
  Prajnesh Gunneswaran
  Sanam Singh
  Victor Baluda
  Michael Venus

Champions

Singles 

  Yuki Bhambri def.  Alexander Kudryavtsev, 4–6, 6–3, 7–5

Doubles 

  Yuki Bhambri /  Michael Venus def.  N. Sriram Balaji /  Blaž Rola, 6–4, 7–6(7–3)

External links 

2014
Shriram Capital P.L. Reddy Memorial Challenger
Sports competitions in Chennai
2010s in Chennai
Shriram Capital P.L. Reddy Memorial Challenger
2014 in Indian tennis